Bobby Daniel Brooks (born February 24, 1951) is a former American football defensive back who played three seasons with the New York Giants of the National Football League (NFL). He was drafted by the Giants in the 11th round of the 1974 NFL Draft. He played college football at Bishop College and attended I.M. Terrell High School in Fort Worth, Texas.

References

External links
Just Sports Stats

Living people
1951 births
Players of American football from Dallas
American football defensive backs
African-American players of American football
Bishop Tigers football players
New York Giants players
21st-century African-American people
20th-century African-American sportspeople